Pierre Gustave Toutant-Beauregard (May 28, 1818 - February 20, 1893) was a Confederate general officer of Louisiana Creole descent who started the American Civil War by leading the attack on Fort Sumter on April 12, 1861. Today, he is commonly referred to as P. G. T. Beauregard, but he rarely used his first name as an adult. He signed correspondence as G. T. Beauregard.

Trained in military and civil engineering at the United States Military Academy, West Point, Beauregard served with distinction as an engineer officer in the Mexican–American War. Following a brief appointment as superintendent of the U.S. Military Academy in 1861, and after Louisiana seceded, he resigned from the United States Army and became the first brigadier general in the Confederate States Army. He commanded the defenses of Charleston, South Carolina, at the start of the Civil War at Fort Sumter on April 12, 1861. Three months later he won the First Battle of Bull Run near Manassas, Virginia.

Beauregard held several key commands in the Western Theater, including control of armies at the Battle of Shiloh in Tennessee, and the Siege of Corinth in northern Mississippi, both in 1862. He returned to Charleston and defended it in 1863 from repeated naval and land attacks by Union forces. He is most known for his defense of the industrial city of Petersburg, Virginia, from Union troops in June 1864, which delayed the eventual fall of the Confederate capital of Richmond, Virginia in April 1865.

His influence over Confederate strategy was lessened by his poor professional relationships with President Jefferson Davis and other senior generals and officials. In April 1865, Beauregard and his commander, General Joseph E. Johnston, convinced Davis and the remaining cabinet members that the war needed to end. Johnston surrendered most of the remaining armies of the Confederacy, including Beauregard and his men, to Major General William Tecumseh Sherman.

After his military career, Beauregard returned to Louisiana, where he advocated black civil rights including suffrage, served as a railroad executive, and became wealthy as a promoter of the Louisiana Lottery.

Early life and education

Beauregard was born at the "Contreras" sugar-cane plantation in St. Bernard Parish, Louisiana, about  outside New Orleans, to a Louisiana Creole family. Beauregard was the third child of Hélène Judith de Reggio, of mixed French and Italian ancestry and descendant of Francesco M. de Reggio, member of an Italian noble family whose family had migrated first to France and then to Louisiana, and her husband, Jacques Toutant-Beauregard, of French and Welsh ancestry. He had three brothers and three sisters. As was typical for Louisiana Creoles, his family spoke French and practiced Roman Catholicism.

As a child, Beauregard befriended and played with slave boys his own age, and was weaned as a baby by a St. Dominican slave woman. He grew up in a large one-story house, unlike the "later plantation palaces, but a mansion of aristocracy by the standards of its time." Beauregard hunted and rode in the woods and fields around his family's plantation and paddled his boat in its waterways.  Beauregard attended New Orleans private schools and then went to a "French school" in New York City. During his four years in New York, beginning at age 12, he learned to speak English, as French had been his first and only language in Louisiana.

He then attended the United States Military Academy at West Point, New York. One of his instructors was Robert Anderson, who later became the commander of Fort Sumter and surrendered to Beauregard at the start of the Civil War. Upon enrolling at West Point, Beauregard dropped the hyphen from his surname and treated Toutant as a middle name, to fit in with his classmates. From that point on, he rarely used his first name, preferring "G. T. Beauregard." He graduated second in his class in 1838 and excelled both as an artilleryman and military engineer. His Army friends gave him many nicknames: "Little Creole", "Bory", "Little Frenchman", "Felix", and "Little Napoleon".

Early military career

During the Mexican–American War, Beauregard served as an engineer under General Winfield Scott. He was appointed brevet captain for the battles of Contreras and Churubusco and major for Chapultepec, where he was wounded in the shoulder and thigh. He was noted for his eloquent performance in a meeting with Scott in which he convinced the assembled general officers to change their plan for attacking the fortress of Chapultepec. He was one of the first officers to enter Mexico City. Beauregard considered his contributions in dangerous reconnaissance missions and devising strategy for his superiors to be more significant than those of his engineer colleague, Captain Robert E. Lee, so he was disappointed when Lee and other officers received more brevets than he did.

Beauregard returned from Mexico in 1848. For the next 12 years, he was in charge of what the Engineer Department called "the Mississippi and Lake defenses in Louisiana." Much of his engineering work was done elsewhere, repairing old forts and building new ones on the Florida coast and in Mobile, Alabama. He also improved the defenses of Forts St. Philip and Jackson on the Mississippi River below New Orleans. He worked on a board of Army and Navy engineers to improve the navigation of the shipping channels at the mouth of the Mississippi. He created and patented an invention he called a "self-acting bar excavator" to be used by ships in crossing bars of sand and clay. While serving in the Army, he actively campaigned for the election of Franklin Pierce, the Democratic presidential candidate in 1852, and a former general in the Mexican War who had been impressed by Beauregard's performance at Mexico City. Pierce appointed Beauregard as superintending engineer of the U.S. Custom House in New Orleans, a huge granite building that had been built in 1848. As it was sinking unevenly in the moist soil of Louisiana, Beauregard had to develop a renovation program. He served in this position from 1853 to 1860 and stabilized the structure successfully.

During his service in New Orleans, Beauregard became dissatisfied as a peacetime officer. He informed the U.S. Army Engineer Department late in 1856 that he was going to join the filibuster with William Walker, who had seized control of Nicaragua; he had offered Beauregard the rank of second-in-command of his army. Senior officers, including general-in-chief Winfield Scott, convinced Beauregard to stay in the United States. He briefly entered politics as a reform candidate for mayor of New Orleans in 1858, where he was promoted by both the Whig and Democratic parties to challenge the Know Nothing party candidate. Beauregard was narrowly defeated.

Employing the political influence of his brother-in-law, John Slidell, Beauregard obtained an appointment as superintendent of the U.S. Military Academy on January 23, 1861. When Louisiana seceded from the Union, the Federal Government immediately revoked his orders and he subsequently relinquished his office after only five days. He protested to the U.S. War Department that they had cast "improper reflection upon [his] reputation or position in the Corps of Engineers" by forcing him out as a Southern officer before any hostilities began.

American Civil War

Charleston

Beauregard traveled by steamship from New York to New Orleans and immediately began giving military advice to the local authorities in his home state of Louisiana, which included further strengthening Forts St. Philip and Jackson, which guarded the Mississippi approaches to New Orleans. He hoped to be named commander of the Louisiana state army, but was disappointed that the state legislature appointed Braxton Bragg. Aware that Beauregard might resent him, Bragg offered him the rank of colonel. Instead Beauregard enrolled as a private in the "Orleans Guards", a battalion of French Creole aristocrats. At the same time, he communicated with Slidell and the newly chosen President Davis, angling for a senior position in the new Confederate States Army. Rumors that Beauregard would be placed in charge of the entire Army infuriated Bragg. Concerned about the political situation regarding the Federal presence at Fort Sumter in Charleston Harbor, Davis selected Beauregard to take command of Charleston's defenses. Beauregard seemed the perfect combination of military engineer and charismatic Southern leader needed at that time and place.

Beauregard became one of the most frequently described generals in Confederate chronicles, and almost every observer noted his foreign French visage. His comportment was "courteous, grave, sometimes reserved and severe, sometimes abrupt with people who displeased him." Associates saw him go months without smiling. "Many who saw him thought he looked like a French marshal or like Napoleon in a gray uniform - which was what he wanted them to think."

"Because he was French and seemed different, he was the victim of all kind of rumors, most of them baseless. The charge of immorality was, of course, inevitable. Some soldiers believed that he was accompanied by a train of concubines and wagons loaded with cases of champagne. Even in Louisiana it was said, by non-Creoles, that he was unfaithful to his wife, infidelity being allegedly a Creole characteristic."

"[Beauregard's] military retinue was a wonderful collection in itself to inspire rumor. His staff glittered with former governors and senators serving as voluntary aides." Beauregard also kept the company of Frederick Maginnis, a slave he had rented from a South Carolinian woman. "Another eminent camp follower was a young Spaniard who served as Beauregard's barber and valet."

Beauregard became the first Confederate general officer, appointed a brigadier general in the Provisional Army of the Confederate States on March 1, 1861. (On July 21, he was promoted to full general in the Confederate Army, one of only seven appointed to that rank; his date of rank made him the fifth most senior general, behind Samuel Cooper, Albert Sidney Johnston, Robert E. Lee, and Joseph E. Johnston.)

Arriving in Charleston on March 3, 1861, Beauregard met with Governor Francis Wilkinson Pickens and inspected the defenses of the harbor, which he found to be in disarray. He was said to display "a great deal in the way of zeal and energy ... but little professional knowledge and experience." Major Robert Anderson at Fort Sumter wrote to Washington, D.C., that Beauregard, who had been his student at West Point in 1837, would guarantee that South Carolina's actions be exercised with "skill and sound judgment." Beauregard wrote to the Confederate government that Anderson was a "most gallant officer". He sent several cases of fine brandy and whiskey and boxes of cigars to Anderson and his officers at Sumter, but Anderson ordered that the gifts be returned.

By early April, political tensions were mounting and Beauregard demanded that Sumter surrender before a planned Union expedition to re-provision the fort could arrive. Early on the morning of April 12, negotiations with Anderson had failed. Beauregard ordered the first shots of the American Civil War to be fired from nearby Fort Johnson. The bombardment of Fort Sumter lasted for 34 hours. After a heavy bombardment from batteries ringing the harbor, Anderson surrendered Fort Sumter on April 14. Biographer T. Harry Williams described the extravagant praise from throughout the Confederacy that "The Hero of Fort Sumter" received for his victory: "He was the South's first paladin."

First Bull Run (First Manassas)

Summoned to the new Confederate capital of Richmond, Virginia, Beauregard received a hero's welcome at the railroad stations along the route. He was given command of the "Alexandria Line" of defenses against an impending Federal offensive that was being organized by Brig. Gen. Irvin McDowell (one of Beauregard's West Point classmates) against the Confederate railroad junction at Manassas. Beauregard devised strategies to concentrate the forces of (full) General Joseph E. Johnston from the Shenandoah Valley with his own, aiming not only to defend his position, but to initiate an offensive against McDowell and Washington. Despite his seniority in rank, Johnston lacked familiarity with the terrain and ceded tactical planning of the impending battle to Beauregard as a professional courtesy. President Davis considered many of Beauregard's plans to be impractical for an army as inexperienced as the Confederates could field in 1861; throughout the war, Davis and Beauregard would argue about Beauregard's tendencies to devise grand strategies based on formal military principles. Davis believed he lacked a pragmatic grasp of logistics, intelligence, relative military strengths, and politics.

The First Battle of Bull Run (First Manassas) began early on July 21, 1861, with an element of surprise for both armies— both McDowell and Beauregard planned to envelop their opponent with an attack from their right flank. McDowell struck first, crossing Bull Run and threatening Beauregard's left flank. For a while, Beauregard persisted in moving his troops for an attack on his right flank (McDowell's left, toward Centreville), but Johnston urged him to travel with him to the threatened flank at Henry House Hill, which was weakly defended. Seeing the strength of the Union attack at that point, Beauregard insisted that Johnston leave the area of immediate action and coordinate the overall battle from a position  to the rear. Beauregard rallied the troops, riding among the men, brandishing regimental colors, and giving inspirational speeches. The Confederate line held.

As Johnston's final troops arrived from the Shenandoah Valley, the Confederates launched a counterattack that routed the Union Army, sending it streaming in disorder back toward Washington. William C. Davis credits Johnston with the majority of the tactical decisions that led to the victory, judging that "Beauregard acted chiefly as a dime novel general, leading the charge of an individual regiment, riding along the line to cheer the troops, accepting the huzzas of the soldiers and complementing them in turn. The closest he came to a major tactical decision was his fleeting intention to withdraw from the Henry Hill line when he briefly mistook the advance of Johnston's reinforcements for the arrival of fresh Union troops." Nonetheless, Beauregard received the bulk of the acclaim from the press and general public. On July 23, Johnston recommended to President Davis that Beauregard be promoted to full general. Davis approved, and Beauregard's date of rank was established as the date of his victory, July 21.

After Bull Run, Beauregard advocated the use of a standardized battle flag other than the "Stars and Bars" Confederate national flag to avoid visual confusion with the U.S. flag. He worked with Johnston and William Porcher Miles to create the Confederate Battle Flag. Confederate women visiting Beauregard's army contributed silk material from their dresses to create the first three flags, for Beauregard, Johnston, and Earl Van Dorn; thus, the first flags contained more feminine pink than martial red. However, the official battle flag had a red background with white stars. Throughout his career, Beauregard worked to have the flag adopted, and he helped to make it the most popular symbol of the Confederacy.

As the Army went into winter quarters, Beauregard caused considerable friction with the Confederate high command. He strongly advocated an invasion of Maryland to threaten the flank and rear of Washington. With his plan rebuffed as impractical, he requested reassignment to New Orleans, which he assumed would be under Union attack in the near future, but his request was denied.  He quarreled with Commissary General Lucius B. Northrop (a personal friend of Davis) about the inadequate supplies available to his army. He issued public statements challenging the ability of the Confederate Secretary of War to give commands to a full general. And he enraged President Davis when his report about Bull Run was printed in the newspaper, which suggested that Davis's interference with Beauregard's plans prevented the pursuit and full destruction of McDowell's army and the capture of Washington.

Shiloh and Corinth

Having become a political liability in Virginia, Beauregard was transferred to Tennessee to become second-in-command to General Albert Sidney Johnston (no relation to Joseph E. Johnston) in his Army of Mississippi, effective March 14, 1862. The two generals planned the concentration of Confederate forces to oppose the advance of Maj. Gen. Ulysses S. Grant before he could combine his army with that of Maj. Gen. Don Carlos Buell in a thrust up the Tennessee River toward Corinth, Mississippi. The march from Corinth was plagued by bad weather, which delayed the army's arrival by several days, and during that time, several contacts were made with Union scouts. Because of this, Beauregard felt the element of surprise had been lost and recommended calling off the attack, but Johnston decided to proceed with the plan. In the Battle of Shiloh, which began April 6, 1862, the Confederates launched a surprise attack against Grant's Army of the Tennessee, which despite days of prior reports of Confederate troop movements, were completely unaware that the entire Army of Mississippi was coming right at them. Once again a more senior general named Johnston deferred to the junior Beauregard in planning the attack. This arrangement caused intermingling of units and confusion of command; it failed to concentrate mass at the appropriate place on the line to affect the overall objectives of the attack. In midafternoon, Johnston, who was near the front of the battle action, was mortally wounded. Beauregard, positioned in the rear of the army to send reinforcements forward, assumed command of the army and Johnston's overall Western department (officially designated "Department Number Two"). As darkness fell, he chose to call off the attack against Grant's final defensive line, which had contracted into a tight semicircle backed up to the Tennessee River at Pittsburg Landing.

Beauregard's decision was one of the most controversial of the Civil War. Numerous veterans and historians have wondered what might have happened if the assault had gone forward into the night. Beauregard believed that the battle was essentially won and his men could finish off Grant in the morning. He knew the terrain to be crossed (a steep ravine containing a creek named Dill Branch) was extremely difficult and Grant's defensive line was heavy with massed artillery and supported by gunboats in the river. Unbeknownst to Beauregard, Buell's Army of the Ohio began arriving that afternoon, and he and Grant launched a massive counterattack on April 7. Overwhelmed, the Confederates retreated to Corinth.

Grant was temporarily disgraced by the surprise attack and near defeat, causing his superior, Maj. Gen. Henry W. Halleck, to assume field command of the combined armies. Halleck cautiously and slowly approached Beauregard's fortifications at Corinth; his action became derisively called the Siege of Corinth. Beauregard withdrew from Corinth on May 29 to Tupelo, Mississippi. He was able to deceive Halleck into thinking the Confederates were about to attack; he ran empty trains back and forth through the town while whistles blew and troops cheered as if massive reinforcements were arriving. Beauregard retreated because of the overwhelming Union force and because of contaminated water supplies in Corinth. In April and May, the Confederates lost almost as many men to death by disease in Corinth as had been killed in battle at Shiloh. Nevertheless, his leaving the critical rail junction at Corinth without a fight was another controversial decision. When Beauregard went on medical leave without requesting permission in advance, President Davis relieved him of command and replaced him with Gen. Braxton Bragg.

Return to Charleston

At Beauregard's request, his allies in the Confederate Congress petitioned Davis to restore his command in the West. Davis remained angry at Beauregard's absence and told him he should have stayed at his post even if he had to be carried around in a litter. He wrote, "If the whole world were to ask me to restore General Beauregard to the command which I have already given to General Bragg, I would refuse it." Beauregard was ordered to Charleston and took command of coastal defenses in South Carolina, Georgia, and Florida, replacing Maj. Gen. John C. Pemberton. The latter was promoted to lieutenant general and transferred to command the defenses of Vicksburg, Mississippi.

Beauregard was unhappy with his new assignment, believing that he deserved command of one of the great Confederate field armies. He performed successfully, however, preventing the capture of Charleston by Union naval and land attacks in 1863. On April 7, 1863, Rear Admiral Samuel Francis Du Pont, commander of the South Atlantic Blockading Squadron, led a union ironclad attack against Fort Sumter that was repulsed by highly accurate artillery fire from Beauregard's forces. In July through September 1863, union land forces under Brig. Gen. Quincy A. Gillmore launched a series of attacks on Fort Wagner on Morris Island and other fortifications at the mouth of the harbor, while Rear Adm. John A. Dahlgren attempted to destroy Fort Sumter. Because the latter operation failed, the successful seizure of Morris Island was not effective in threatening Charleston.

During this period, Beauregard promoted innovative naval defense strategies, such as early experimentation with submarines, naval mines (called "torpedoes" in the Civil War), and with a small vessel called a torpedo-ram. A swift boat fitted with a torpedo on a pole projecting from its bow under water, it could be used to surprise an enemy vessel and impale it underneath the water line. He was also busy devising strategies for other generals in the Confederacy. He proposed that some of the state governors meet with Union governors of the Western states (what are called the Midwest states today) for a peace conference. The Davis administration rejected the idea, but it caused considerable political maneuvering by Davis's enemies in the Congress. Beauregard also proposed a grand strategy—submitted anonymously through his political allies so that it was not tainted by his reputation—to reinforce the Western armies at the expense of Robert E. Lee's army in Virginia, destroy the Federal army in Tennessee, which would induce Ulysses S. Grant to relieve pressure on Vicksburg and maneuver his army into a place where it could be destroyed. The Confederate Army would continue to Ohio, and induce the Western states to ally with the Confederacy. Meanwhile, a fleet of torpedo-rams built in England could be used to recapture New Orleans, ending the war. There is no record that his plan was ever officially presented to the government.

While visiting his forces in Florida, which had just repelled a Union advance at Jacksonville, Beauregard received a telegram that his wife had died on March 2, 1864. Living in Union-occupied New Orleans, she had been seriously ill for two years. A Northern-leaning local newspaper printed an opinion that her husband's actions had exacerbated her condition. This so fanned negative popular opinion that 6,000 people attended her funeral. Union Maj. Gen. Nathaniel P. Banks provided a steamer to carry her body upriver for burial in her native parish. Beauregard wrote that he would like to rescue "her hallowed grave" at the head of an army.

Richmond

In April 1864, Beauregard saw little opportunity for military glory because he foresaw that there would be no more significant assaults against Charleston, and prospects for a major field command were unlikely. He requested a leave to recover from fatigue and a chronic throat ailment, but he instead received an order to report to Weldon, North Carolina, near the Virginia border, to play a key role in the defense of Virginia. His new assignment, the Department of North Carolina and Cape Fear, also included Virginia south of the James River. When he took command on April 18, he renamed it, on his own initiative, the Department of North Carolina and Southern Virginia. The Confederates were preparing for the spring offensive of Union Lt. Gen. Ulysses S. Grant and were concerned that attacks south of Richmond could interrupt the critical supply lines to Richmond and the army of Robert E. Lee.

As Grant moved south against Lee in the Overland campaign, Union Maj. Gen. Benjamin Butler launched the surprise Bermuda Hundred Campaign with landings up the James River. Beauregard successfully lobbied with Jefferson Davis's military adviser, Braxton Bragg, to prevent significant units of his small force from being transferred north of Richmond to the aid of Lee. His timely action, coupled with the military incompetence of Butler, bottled up the Union army, nullifying its threat to Petersburg and Lee's supply line. Now that this sector was stable, pressure began to rise to transfer troops from Beauregard's front to Lee's. Beauregard did send a division (Maj. Gen. Robert Hoke's) to Lee for the Battle of Cold Harbor, but Lee urgently wanted more and took the step of offering Beauregard command of the right wing of the Army of Northern Virginia for his cooperation. Beauregard replied in a passive–aggressive manner, "I am willing to do anything for our success, but cannot leave my Department without orders of War Department."

After Cold Harbor, Lee and the Confederate high command were unable to anticipate Grant's next move, but Beauregard's strategic sense allowed him to make a prophetic prediction: Grant crossed the James River and attempt to seize Petersburg, which was lightly defended, but contained critical rail junctions supporting Richmond and Lee. Despite persistent pleas to reinforce this sector, Beauregard could not convince his colleagues of the danger. On June 15, his weak 5,400-man force—including boys, old men, and patients from military hospitals—resisted an assault by 16,000 Federals, known as the Second Battle of Petersburg. He gambled by withdrawing his Bermuda Hundred defenses to reinforce the city, assuming correctly that Butler would not capitalize on the opening. His gamble succeeded, and he held Petersburg long enough for Lee's army to arrive. It was arguably his finest combat performance of the war.

Beauregard continued commanding the defenses of Petersburg in the early days of the siege, but with the loss of the Weldon Railroad in the Battle of Globe Tavern (August 18–21), he was criticized for not attacking more forcefully and he became dissatisfied with the command arrangements under Lee. He hoped for an independent command, but his desires were thwarted in two instances: Lee chose Lt. Gen. Jubal Early to lead an expedition north through the Shenandoah Valley and threaten Washington, and Davis chose Lt. Gen. John Bell Hood to replace the faltering Joseph E. Johnston in the Atlanta campaign.

Return to the West

After the fall of Atlanta in September 1864, President Davis considered replacing John Bell Hood in command of the Army of Tennessee and he asked Robert E. Lee to find out if Beauregard would be interested. Beauregard was indeed interested, but it is unclear whether Davis seriously considered the appointment, and in the end decided to retain Hood. Davis met with Beauregard in Augusta, Georgia, on October 2 and offered him command of the newly created Department of the West, responsible for the five Southern states from Georgia to the Mississippi River, with the armies of Hood and Richard Taylor under his ostensible command. However, it was a thankless job that was limited to logistical and advisory responsibilities, without true operational control of the armies unless he should join them in person during an emergency. Nevertheless, anxious to return to the field, he accepted the assignment.

The major field operation of the fall was Hood's Franklin-Nashville Campaign, an invasion of Tennessee, which he undertook under Beauregard and Davis' orders. Beauregard always kept in touch with Hood, despite all the obstacles facing the latter general's way. The two later developed a friendship that lasted until Hood's death in 1879, after which Beauregard became chairman of the Hood Relief Committee; he arranged for the publication of Hood's memoirs, Advance and Retreat, in order to care for the orphaned Hood children.

While Hood traveled through Alabama and into Tennessee, Union Maj. Gen. William Tecumseh Sherman began his March to the Sea from Atlanta to Savannah, which focused Beauregard's attention back to Georgia. He was ineffective in stopping, or even delaying, Sherman's advance. He had inadequate local forces and was reluctant to strip defenses from other locations to concentrate them against Sherman. Furthermore, Sherman did an excellent job of deceiving the Confederates as to the intermediate and final targets of his march. Savannah fell on December 21, and Sherman's army began to march north into South Carolina in January. Also in late December, Beauregard found out that Hood's army had been severely weakened in its defeat at the Battle of Nashville; there were very few men in fighting condition who could oppose Sherman's advance.

Beauregard attempted to concentrate his small forces before Sherman could reach Columbia, South Carolina, the state capital. His urgent dispatches to Richmond were treated with disbelief—Davis and Robert E. Lee (now the general in chief of all the Confederate armies) could not believe that Sherman was advancing without a supply line as quickly as Beauregard was observing him do. Also concerned about what he considered Beauregard's "feeble health," Lee recommended to Davis that he be replaced by Joseph E. Johnston. The change of command came on February 22 and Beauregard, although outwardly cooperative and courteous to Johnston, was bitterly disappointed at his replacement. For the remainder of the war, Beauregard was Johnston's subordinate, assigned to routine matters without combat responsibilities. Johnston and Beauregard met with President Davis on April 13, and their assessment of the Confederate situation helped convince Davis that Johnston should meet with Sherman to negotiate a surrender of his army. The two surrendered to Sherman near Durham, North Carolina, on April 26, 1865, and were paroled in Greensboro on May 2. Beauregard traveled to Mobile and then took a U.S. naval transport to his hometown of New Orleans. In August that year, Beauregard's house was surrounded by troops who suspected he was harboring Edmund Kirby Smith. All the inhabitants were locked in a cotton press overnight. Beauregard complained to General Philip Sheridan who expressed his annoyance at his erstwhile enemy's treatment.

Post-Bellum Career

Later life

After the war, Beauregard was reluctant to seek amnesty as a former Confederate officer by publicly swearing an oath of loyalty, but both Lee and Johnston counseled him to do so, which he did before the mayor of New Orleans on September 16, 1865. He was one of many Confederate officers issued a mass pardon by President Andrew Johnson on July 4, 1868. His final privilege as an American citizen, the right to run for public office, was restored when he petitioned the Congress for relief and the bill on his behalf was signed by President Grant on July 24, 1876.

Beauregard pursued a position in the Brazilian Army in 1865, but declined the Brazilians' offer. He claimed that the positive attitude of President Johnson toward the South swayed his decision. "I prefer to live here, poor and forgotten, than to be endowed with honor and riches in a foreign country." He also declined offers to take command of the armies of Romania and Egypt.

Beauregard worked to end the harsh penalties levied on Louisiana by Radical Republicans during Reconstruction. His outrage over the perceived excesses of Reconstruction, such as heavy property taxation, was a principal source for his indecision about remaining in the United States and his flirtation with foreign armies, which lasted until 1875. He was active in the Reform Party, an association of conservative New Orleans businessmen, which spoke in favor of black civil rights and voting, and attempted to form alliances between black and white Louisianians to vote out the Radical Republicans in control of the state legislature.

Beauregard's first employment following the war was in October 1865 as chief engineer and general superintendent of the New Orleans, Jackson and Great Northern Railroad. In 1866 he was promoted to president, a position he retained until 1870, when he was ousted in a hostile takeover. This job overlapped with that of president of the New Orleans and Carrollton Street Railway (1866–1876), where he invented a system of cable-powered street railway cars. Once again, Beauregard made a financial success of the company, but was fired by stockholders who wished to take direct management of the company.

In 1869, he demonstrated a cable car and was issued .

After the loss of these two railway executive positions, Beauregard spent time briefly at a variety of companies and civil engineering pursuits, but his personal wealth became assured when he was recruited as a supervisor of the Louisiana State Lottery Company in 1877. He and former Confederate general Jubal Early presided over lottery drawings and made numerous public appearances, lending the effort some respectability. For 15 years the two generals served in these positions, but the public became opposed to government-sponsored gambling and the lottery was closed down by the legislature.

Beauregard's military writings include Principles and Maxims of the Art of War (1863), Report on the Defense of Charleston, and A Commentary on the Campaign and Battle of Manassas (1891). He was the uncredited co-author of his friend Alfred Roman's The Military Operations of General Beauregard in the War Between the States (1884). He contributed the article "The Battle of Bull Run" to Century Illustrated Monthly Magazine in November 1884. During these years, Beauregard and Davis published a series of bitter accusations and counter-accusations retrospectively blaming each other for the Confederate defeat.

Beauregard served as adjutant general for the Louisiana state militia, 1879–88. During the late nineteenth century the Knights of Labor, an organization for labor advocacy and militancy, organized sugar worker wage strikes. Democratic newspapers began circulating false reports of black-on-white violence from the Knights of Labor, and several states called out militias to break the strikes. In 1887,  Democratic Governor John McEnery called for the assistance of ten infantry companies and an artillery company of the state militia. They were to protect black strikebreakers and suppress the wage strikers. A part of the militia arrived to suppress wage strikers in St. Mary Parish, resulting in the Thibodaux Massacre; the Attakapas Rangers led by Captain C. T. Cade joined a sheriff's posse facing down a group of sugar strikers. When one of the wage strikers reached into a pocket, posse members opened fire into the crowd, "as many as twenty people" killed or wounded on November 5 in the black village of Pattersonville.

Ultimately, the militia protected some 800 strikebreakers in Terrebone Parish, and captured and arrested 50 wage strikers, mostly for union activities. The Knights of Labor strike collapsed there, and sugar workers returned to the plantations.

In 1888, he was elected as commissioner of public works in New Orleans. When John Bell Hood and his wife died in 1879, leaving ten destitute orphans, Beauregard used his influence to get Hood's memoirs published, with all proceeds going to the children. He was appointed by the governor of Virginia to be the grand marshal of the festivities associated with the laying of the cornerstone of Robert E. Lee's statue in Richmond. But when Jefferson Davis died in 1889, Beauregard refused the honor of heading the funeral procession, saying "We have always been enemies. I cannot pretend I am sorry he is gone. I am no hypocrite."

Beauregard died in his sleep in New Orleans. The cause of death was recorded as "heart disease, aortic insufficiency, and probably myocarditis." Edmund Kirby Smith, the last surviving full general of the Confederacy, served as the "chief mourner" as Beauregard was interred in the vault of the Army of Tennessee in historic Metairie Cemetery.

Personal life 
In 1841, Beauregard married Marie Antoinette Laure Villeré (1823-1850), the daughter of a Louisiana sugarcane planter. The two had three children - Rene (1843-1910), Henri (1845-1915), and Laure (1850-1884). Marie died giving birth to her only daughter. In 1860, Beauregard married Caroline Deslonde (1831-1864), who died in New Orleans following a long illness.

Civil rights advocacy

Treatment by Anglo-Americans due to his Creole heritage

Beauregard in his young adult years had lived and served primarily with Anglo-Americans in the US army (a rarity for Louisiana Creoles). For the bloody years of the Civil War he fought almost exclusively with Anglo-American Confederates; the prevailing attitudes of his Anglo-American peers were anti-Catholic and antiforeign, and he was rejected by many of them; they often ignored his opinions during the Civil War, such as his emphasis on the defense of New Orleans and his native Louisiana. In the Confederacy, because he was a Creole Frenchman and seemed different, he was the victim of all kinds of rumors.

An example of these Confederate rumors is his treatment after he was defeated in the Battle of Shiloh; rumors circulated that during the battle he was lying in a tent crying because of sadness and depression. Another rumor from the Confederate media said that the Frenchman was insane and stayed in his quarters fondling a pheasant. They spun the tale that a soldier found a pheasant cowering in a bush and brought it back to Beauregard as a present, and that Beauregard ordered the soldier to cage it as a present for one of his friends. The media claimed that on the day of the battle, both the hopes of a Confederate victory and the bird disappeared with the Creole.

The soldiers who served under Beauregard respected him greatly; here is a quote where a Confederate soldier relates to his father the cheer Beauregard's men gave him after the defeat at the Battle of Shiloh: 

Non-Creoles continually judged him as being immoral, especially due to him being a favorite of ladies, constantly receiving letters, flags, scarves, desks, and flowers. His entourage during the war included a black man from South Carolina named Frederick Maginnis whom Beauregard made his confidant and with whom he talked freely of his war plans, and a young Spaniard who acted as his barber and valet. However, due to the constant need to conform to Anglo-American societal pressures, Beauregard always sought to Americanize himself. One such example was his refusal to use his first name 'Pierre', always signing his name 'G.T. Beauregard' in order to not seem foreign to his peers.

As the Civil War ended, Beauregard went back to his native Louisiana, which in the meantime had been under Federal occupation and had adopted many Anglo-American racial policies and attitudes. Beauregard had not been home for years, and just one week after his return to New Orleans, as he was going down a road in Algiers, he was stopped by an Anglo-American man with anti-Creole sentiments. The man screamed at him "I always did believe you were a nigger. Tell me if you are a nigger or not," and continued his stream of abuse, the result of which caused Beauregard to flee the area.

Political views after the end of the Civil War

Reconstruction was a period of great unrest, and resulted in the rise of racial tension and political bipartisanship. Two parties, Republican and Democrat, now controlled the political power in the American Union, and they also had to contend with the lower classes having the right to vote. 

In Louisiana, for example, laws had been put in place ever since Louisiana's admission into the Union that restricted the vote to only the elite class, the grands habitants. These were the aristocratic planters throughout the state; now all men of any class could vote, and the Republicans and Democrats sought supporters.

Republicans served mainly Northern interests such as industrialization, while Democrats served mainly Southern interests such as revitalizing the plantation economy. In the South, poor whites began to vote mostly for Democrats, and freed slaves began to vote mostly for Republicans. Voting and racial tensions were being inflamed in the South, causing public demonstrations, fighting, and riots between the groups. New Orleans was split between Democrats and Republicans.

Beauregard was insulted, even ridiculed at his home in New Orleans, Louisiana, and had the threat looming of being arrested, exiled, or executed by the Federal Government for having joined the Confederacy. Indeed, Federal troops surrounded Beauregard's home one night as they were hunting for Confederate fugitives. The Federal soldiers imprisoned Beauregard and all of his family in a cotton press overnight as they ransacked his home.

Beauregard was in a very dark place of his life in 1865. As Reconstruction began, Southern Democrats began to blame the newly emancipated black population of their states for the widespread postwar poverty, destruction, and starvation. Beauregard wrote a letter to his brother-in-law John Slidell in regards to the newly freed slaves; His words echoed the ideas of his embittered Democratic Confederate colleagues,  that freed slaves were inferior, ignorant, and indolent; freed slaves had not yet voted in the South, and at this time it did not appear to him that they would. In this period, Beauregard was a Democrat.

Political views during the Reconstruction Era

In the years following the beginning of Reconstruction, Beauregard's opinions changed. Unlike other ex-Confederates, his economic situation improved, and his native home of Louisiana seemed soon to be redeemed from the Reconstruction Period. Beauregard played a prominent vocal role in Louisiana during Reconstruction, and he began writing many letters, gave interviews, and made speeches about almost every issue of that time. 

In March 1867, Radical Republicans enforced black suffrage but, when many Southerners became angry and resistant, Beauregard wrote a widely published letter advising Southerners to accept the new situation. He said that the South could either submit or resist, and common sense made it clear that resistance was futile.

Beauregard sought to end the bickering between the Democrats and the Republicans; he felt that by encouraging the cooperation of the races through voting, a better future could be created for the South. His pragmatic change of opinion was exemplified when he argued that emancipated blacks were native to the South, and that all they needed was education and property to take an active interest in Southern politics.

In 1868, while Beauregard was vacationing at White Sulphur Springs, West Virginia, Robert E. Lee invited him to a resort, along with other famous Confederates, as well as William S. Rosecrans, a former Union general and politician. The purpose of the meeting was to combat the Republican charge that the mostly-Democratic Southerners could not be trusted to deal justly with emancipated blacks. The result of the meeting was a document, signed by the parties present, including Beauregard, stating that the South would accept the results of the war and emancipation, and that they felt kindly towards emancipated blacks, although there was opposition to their exercising of political power.

Rosecrans gave an interview upon returning to the north and described Lee's efforts as somewhat weak but that Lee was a sincere man. When asked if Beauregard was weak, Rosecrans responded: "By the side of Lee, certainly. Take him alone, however, and he strikes you as quick, ready and incisive—well, a man of the world, a good business character, a smart active Frenchman. But with Lee he dwindles. Lee says shut the door, and Beauregard shuts the door." When asked by the interviewer if the Southern generals would really allow freed slaves to vote, Rosecrans responded: "Lee will not, probably, but Beauregard will. He is in favor of it and so expressed himself to me".

Beauregard became a deep admirer of Abraham Lincoln. In 1889, he was personally invited by the president of the Lincoln Memorial League to participate in ceremonies at Springfield, Illinois that were honoring Abraham Lincoln. Beauregard wanted to go, but he was unfortunately unable to make the trip. He replied regretfully that he would be present in spirit to pay homage. Beauregard wrote the following in regards to Abraham Lincoln:

Political activism

Beauregard continued voting Republican, but Radical Republicans maintained the heavy taxation of the South; he sought ways to change the economical situation of his state. In a public letter, he endorsed the 1872 Liberal Republican nominee Horace Greeley instead of the Radical Republican candidate Ulysses S. Grant. Beauregard "called for peace, reconciliation, a forgetting of old issues, and a union of conservative-minded people to remove corruption and extravagance from the government".

In 1872, Beauregard resumed an interest in politics. He was one of the guiding leaders to form the Reform Party of Louisiana, a Southern party made up of Louisiana businessmen, advocating an economical state government, and recognized black civil and political rights. The Reform Party demanded that the South acknowledge black political power. It attempted to replace the Democratic party and sought to end Radical Republican taxation.

In 1873, the Reform Party created a detailed and specific plan to induce cooperation between the races in a political union. The plan called for the creation of the Louisiana Unification Movement. Approving letters and interviews about the movement came flooding into the newspapers. The majority of the communications came from New Orleans businessmen who declared that they were willing to work with blacks, and recognize their political and civil equality if they would agree to cooperate to lower the high taxes and end the inflammation of racial tension. The chant of the Unification movement was "Equal Rights! One Flag! One Country! One People!"

Louisiana Unification Movement
Beauregard approached Lieutenant Governor Caesar Antoine, who was a Creole Republican, and invited fifty leading white and fifty black New Orleanian families to join for a meeting on June 16, 1873. The fifty white sponsors were leaders of the community in business, legal and journalistic affairs, and the presidents of almost every corporation and bank in the city attended. The black sponsors were the wealthy, cultured Creoles of color, who were well-off and had been free before the war. Beauregard was the chairman of the resolutions committee. He spoke at the meeting:

The result of the meeting was a report that "advocated complete political equality for blacks, an equal division of state offices between the races, and a plan where blacks would become land owners. It denounced discrimination because of color in hiring laborers or in selecting directors of corporations, and called for the abandonment of segregation in public conveyances, public places, railroads, steams, and public schools." Beauregard argued that blacks "already had equality and the whites had to accept that hard fact".

Civil rights legacy

Beauregard lived a paradoxical life. Unlike many ex-Confederates, he did not look back on "the planting South and the mellow glories of the ancient regime" but looked toward the future of the international house of Louisiana, to the industrial district of New Orleans, and a bustling delta of a better tomorrow.

Beauregard was admired by many because of his work after the war, and when he went to a meeting in Waukesha, Wisconsin in 1889, he was given the title by a local reporter of "Sir Galahad of Southern Chivalry". A Northerner at the meeting welcomed Beauregard, commenting on the fact that 25 years ago, the North "did not feel very kindly toward him; but the past was dead and now they admired him". Beauregard responded by saying: "As to my past life, I have always endeavored to do my duty under all circumstances, from the point I entered West Point, a boy of seventeen, up to the present". He was then loudly applauded.

Following Beauregard's death in 1893, Victor E. Rillieux, a Creole of color and poet who wrote poems for many famous contemporary civil rights activists, including Ida B. Wells, was moved by Beauregard's passing to create a poem titled "Dernier Tribut".

Legacy

Beauregard's residence at 1113 Chartres Street in New Orleans is now called the Beauregard-Keyes House, and is operated as a historic house museum. It was previously owned by American author Frances Parkinson Keyes, who wrote a fictional biography of Beauregard in which the house is an important setting.

Beauregard Parish in western Louisiana is named for him, as is Camp Beauregard, a former U.S. Army base and National Guard camp near Pineville in central Louisiana. The unincorporated community of Beauregard, Alabama, is also named for him, as is Beauregard, Mississippi. Four camps are named after Beauregard in the Sons of Confederate Veterans.

An equestrian monument by Alexander Doyle in New Orleans depicted him. The monument was removed on May 17, 2017.

Beauregard was portrayed by Donald Sutherland in the 1999 TNT TV movie The Hunley.

Beauregard Hall is an Instructional Building at Nicholls State University.

Dates of rank

See also
List of American Civil War generals (Confederate)
Bibliography of the American Civil War

Notes

References
 Basso, Hamilton. Beauregard: The Great Creole. New York: Charles Scribner's Sons, 1933. .
 
 Coski, John M. The Confederate Battle Flag: America's Most Embattled Emblem. Boston: Belknap Press, 2005. .
 Cunningham, O. Edward. Shiloh and the Western Campaign of 1862. Edited by Gary Joiner and Timothy Smith. New York: Savas Beatie, 2007. .
 Davis, William C. Battle at Bull Run: A History of the First Major Campaign of the Civil War. Baton Rouge: Louisiana State University Press, 1977. .
 Detzer, David. Allegiance: Fort Sumter, Charleston, and the Beginning of the Civil War. New York: Harcourt, 2001. .
 Detzer, David. Donnybrook: The Battle of Bull Run, 1861. New York: Harcourt, 2004. .
 Eicher, John H., and David J. Eicher. Civil War High Commands. Stanford, CA: Stanford University Press, 2001. .
 Hattaway, Herman M., and Michael J. C. Taylor. "Pierre Gustave Toutant Beauregard." In Leaders of the American Civil War: A Biographical and Historiographical Dictionary, edited by Charles F. Ritter and Jon L. Wakelyn. Westport, CT: Greenwood Press, 1998. .
 Gallagher, Gary W. "Pierre Gustave Toutant Beauregard." In The Confederate General, vol. 1, edited by William C. Davis and Julie Hoffman. Harrisburg, PA: National Historical Society, 1991. .
 Kennedy, Frances H., ed. The Civil War Battlefield Guide. 2nd ed. Boston: Houghton Mifflin Co., 1998. .
 Reed, Rowena. Combined Operations in the Civil War. Annapolis, MD: Naval Institute Press, 1978. .
 Silkenat, David. Raising the White Flag: How Surrender Defined the American Civil War. Chapel Hill: University of North Carolina Press, 2019. .
 Smith, Gustavus, Woodson. (2001) Company "A" Corps of Engineers, U.S.A., 1846-1848, in the Mexican War. Edited by Leonne M. Hudson, The Kent State University Press  
 Williams, T. Harry. P.G.T. Beauregard: Napoleon in Gray. Baton Rouge: Louisiana State University Press, 1955. .
 Wise, Stephen R. Gate of Hell: Campaign for Charleston Harbor, 1863. Columbia: University of South Carolina Press, 1994. .
Woodworth, Steven E. Jefferson Davis and His Generals: The Failure of Confederate Command in the West. Lawrence: University Press of Kansas, 1990. .

Further reading
 Conrad, Glenn R. "Pierre Gustave Toutant Beauregard." In A Dictionary of Louisiana Biography, vol. 1, edited by Glenn R. Conrad. New Orleans: Louisiana Historical Association, 1988. .
 Robertson, William Glenn. Backdoor to Richmond: The Bermuda Hundred Campaign, April–June 1864. Baton Rouge: Louisiana State University Press, 1987. .
 Roman, Alfred. The Military Operations of General Beauregard in the War between the States, 1861 to 1865: Including a Brief Personal Sketch and a Narrative of his Services in the War with Mexico, 1846-8. New York, Da Capo Press, 1994. . First published 1884 by Harper & Brothers.
 Winters, John D. The Civil War in Louisiana. Baton Rouge: Louisiana State University Press, 1963. .

External links

 Caroline Beauregard at History of American Women
 P. G. T. Beauregard biography and timeline 
 
 
 
 
 Several Letters of P. G. T. Beauregard
Correspondences of P.G.T. Beauregard during the American Civil War – held in the Walter Havighurst Special Collections, Miami University
 The Citadel Archives, Beauregard, Pierre Gustave Toutant, 1818–1893
 Hermann Screiner's Beauregard's Charleston Quickstep

 Pierre Gustave Toutant Beauregard Collection at The Historic New Orleans Collection
G.T. Beauregard Papers at Stuart A. Rose Manuscript, Archives, and Rare Book Library, Emory University

1818 births
1893 deaths
 
19th-century American inventors
Activists for African-American civil rights
American military engineers
American military personnel of the Mexican–American War
American military writers
American people of French descent
American people of Italian descent
American people of Welsh descent
Army of Northern Virginia
American slave owners
Beauregard Parish, Louisiana
Burials at Metairie Cemetery
Confederate States Army full generals
Louisiana Creole people
Louisiana Democrats
Members of the Aztec Club of 1847
People from St. Bernard Parish, Louisiana
People of Louisiana in the American Civil War
Superintendents of the United States Military Academy
United States Army officers
United States Military Academy alumni
Writers from New Orleans
Southern Historical Society